Nawab Sahib is a 1978 Hindi film written and directed by eminent Urdu litterateur Rajinder Singh Bedi, starring Rehana Sultan, Parikshit Sahni, Tamanna, Farida Jalal and  Johnny Walker in lead roles.

The film with the receding feudal culture as its thematic background had lyrics by the poet Sahir Ludhianvi composed by C. Arjun.

Cast

Om Prakash as Nawab Sahib
Rehana Sultan as Salma's Sister
Parikshat Sahni as Shaukat Ali
Tamanna as Salma
Johnny Walker as Hameed
Farida Jalal as Memuna
Ranjeet
Veena as Farida
Chand Usmani as Begum
Bharat Bhushan as Salma's Father

Soundtrack
The music was composed by C. Arjun and the lyrics was penned by Sahir Ludhianvi

References

External links
 
Website on Indian Cinema in Hindi

1978 films
1970s Hindi-language films
Films directed by Rajinder Singh Bedi